Waiting for the Light is a 1990 American comedy film written and directed by Christopher Monger and starring Shirley MacLaine, Teri Garr, Clancy Brown, Vincent Schiavelli, John Bedford Lloyd, Colin Baumgartner and Hillary Wolf. It was released on November 2, 1990, by Triumph Films.

Plot

In the early 1960s Kay (Garr), a single mother, inherits a run-down diner in a small town in Washington State and gladly moves from Chicago to run it, taking her young son and daughter and her eccentric Aunt Zena (MacLaine), a former magician and vaudevillian who teaches the children magic tricks. Under her instruction they attempt to take revenge on the curmudgeonly neighbor (Schiavelli) who beat them with a belt for stealing his apples, by faking an apparition of an angry ghost. The trick goes awry and he thinks he has had a vision of an angel. Influenced by the tensions of the Cuban Missile Crisis, crowds flock to the town, making the diner prosper. The children feel very guilty, but the international crisis, the spiritual paradox of the fake vision, and Zena's stroke are all happily resolved in the finale of the film.

Cast    
Shirley MacLaine as Aunt Zena
Teri Garr as Kay Harris
Clancy Brown as Joe
Vincent Schiavelli as Mullins
John Bedford Lloyd as Reverend Stevens
Colin Baumgartner as Eddie
Hillary Wolf as Emily
Jeff McCracken as Charlie
William Dore as Reverend Jones 
Robert Hardwick as Dr. Kelley
Robin Ginsburg as Miss Hicks / Miss Berg
Arthur H. Cahn as Mr. Patterson
Matt Magnano as Tommy 
Mark Drusch as Mr. Trace
Eric Helland as Bob
Peg Phillips as Iris
Kylee Martin as Bobby
Jack McGee as Slim Slater
Michael Marinelli as Tommy's Dad
Don S. Davis as Dr. Norman 
Rob Keenan as Chuck
Angela DiMarco as Meg
Bob Henry as Judge Brown
Ron Lynch as Hot Dog
Jillayne Sorenson as Alice
Corey Gunnestad as Verne

Reception
The film grossed $334,748 in its opening weekend.

References

External links
 
 

1990 films
1990 comedy films
American comedy films
1990s English-language films
Films about the Cuban Missile Crisis
Films directed by Christopher Monger
Films set in 1962
Films set in Washington (state)
Films shot in Washington (state)
Triumph Films films
1990s American films